Pylyp is a Ukraininan masculine given name, cognate to Philip. Notable people with the name include:

 Pylyp Budkivskyi (born 1992), Ukrainian football player
 Pylyp Harmash (born 1989), Ukrainian volleyball player 
 Pylyp Kozytskiy (1893–1960), Ukrainian composer and musicologist
 Pylyp Morachevskyi (1806–1879), Ukrainian poet and translator
 Pylyp Orlyk (1672–1742), Ukrainian hetman

See also
 Pilip
 Filip

Ukrainian masculine given names